Empire Sandy is a tall ship providing chartered tours for the public from Toronto, Canada. She was built as an Englishman/ Larch Deep Sea-class tugboat for war service by the British government in 1943.  After the end of World War II she was renamed Ashford and then Chris M before reverting to the original name of Empire Sandy and being converted to a schooner.

Tugboat history
Empire Sandy was one of 1,464 Empire ships built or acquired for war service by the British government. Built in England in 1943 as a deep sea tugboat, she was tasked with Royal Navy work and salvaging merchant ships damaged in the Battle of the Atlantic and other naval engagements during the Second World War. She served in the North Atlantic Ocean from Iceland to Sierra Leone, the Mediterranean Sea, the Indian Ocean and the Bay of Bengal during the Second World War.

Empire Sandys Second World War 'Official Log-Books' documented all her wartime voyages including the complete particulars of the crew, names, addresses, ages, next of kin etc. The oldest was the Master, E Thomas, 63, and the youngest the Cabin Boy, Kenneth Lewis 15. She met a storm while towing, with His Majesty's Rescue Tug Hesperia,  AFD24 (Admiralty Floating Dock No. 24) off the coast of Libya on 8 February 1945. The tug Hesperia and AFD24 were both blown ashore and lost.

In 1948 she was bare-boat chartered by Risdon Beazley who renamed her Ashford. Together with their Bustler-class tug Twyford, Ashford entered the rescue towage market.  
Ashford is listed as part of the salvage team attending the battleship  after Warspite was drive aground on 23 April 1947 on the way to the breakers. Ashford is incorrectly identified as tug Englishman, however all other particulars are of Ashford (Empire Sandy).
 
Ashford was handed back to the Admiralty in 1952. She was then sold to a Canadian firm, the Great Lakes Paper Company, and renamed Chris M (after Chris Michels, a senior employee of Great Lakes Paper). She then came to the Canadian Great Lakes where she spent fifteen years towing timber rafts for Lake Superior logging companies. In the early 1970s the aged ship was to be sold for scrap, but the steel hull was still in very good condition and she was bought by Nautical Adventures Co. for a possible conversion. They completely rebuilt Chris M as a three-masted schooner in the style of the 1880s and she assumed her original name  Empire Sandy .

On 5 August 2017, Empire Sandy was in collision with the Liberian freighter  at Port Colborne, Ontario.

See also
 List of schooners

Notes

References

External links

Official site
tynetugs.co.uk : Empire Sandy 1943

1942 ships
Tugboats
Ministry of War Transport ships
Empire ships
World War II merchant ships of the United Kingdom
Merchant ships of the United Kingdom
Steamships of the United Kingdom
Merchant ships of Canada
Steamships of Canada
Tall ships of Canada
Schooners
Three-masted ships
Articles containing video clips
Maritime incidents in 2017